Loretta Smith (born 1966) is an American politician and businesswoman who served as a Multnomah County commissioner from 2011 to 2018. She ran unsuccessful campaigns for Portland City Council in 2018 and 2020. Smith is a candidate for Oregon's 6th congressional district in the 2022 election, a new seat created after the 2020 United States census.

Early life and education
Smith was born in Grand Rapids, Michigan, in 1966. Loretta's father, Wade Smith, was a Hall of Fame boxer. In high school, she was a member of the Black Student Union as well as the track and cheerleading teams. At 17, she began attending Oregon State University. She earned a Bachelor of Arts degree in communications in 1987.

Career 
Soon after graduating college, Smith got a job as a staffer for then-U.S. Representative Ron Wyden. She remained on his staff for 21 years, eventually becoming his field representative.

Multnomah County Commission 
Smith began her own political career by running for Multnomah County commissioner in 2010. She came in second place in the initial election, and advanced to the runoff, which she won overwhelmingly by 26 percentage points. She was only the second Black person elected to the Board since the County's founding in 1855. During her first term, Smith focused on investments in programs helping poor youth, created thousands of jobs for vulnerable young people, and expanded programs to keep seniors in their homes. She served on the Portland Metro Workforce Development Board, which aims to curb the unemployment rate especially among people of color. Smith won reelection in 2014 with little opposition.

In 2017, Commissioner Smith brought together local and national Black county officials for a Black and Brown Boys and Men Town Hall to discuss racial disparities in law enforcement and incarceration. Author, actor, and social justice advocate Hill Harper emceed the town hall event, which was a precursor to the National Organization of Black County Officials' annual Economic Development Conference. That same year, the NW Oregon Labor Council recognized Smith with the Labor Partner Award, noting her family's close connections to organized labor.

During her second term, Willamette Week reported that Smith disproportionately spent her office budget on travel and nonprofit contributions. In 2016, the state of Oregon mistakenly claimed she owed $36,000 in taxes and fees, but in 2017 admitted it had made an error. In 2017, Smith was accused by two former staffers of "unprofessional and harassing conduct" and creating a hostile work environment. She was also accused of using county funds for personal expenses such as grocery shopping, claims that were later dismissed. Some Smith supporters questioned the unsubstantiated accusations and claimed she was treated harshly because she was a black woman, describing it as "a political lynching".

Due to term limits, Smith was not able to run again for County Commission and ran for Portland City Council in 2018. She came in second place in the initial election and lost to Jo Ann Hardesty in the runoff. Smith picked up several prominent endorsements, including from all four of Oregon's black state legislators at the time and from former County Commissioners Jules Bailey and Diane McKeel.

In 2020, Smith ran in a special election for City Council to succeed Nick Fish, who had died in office. She earned the support of U.S. Senator Ron Wyden, Oregon Labor Commissioner Val Hoyle, several labor organizations, including Northwest Oregon Labor Council - AFL-CIO, Portland Fire Fighters Association, and SEIU Local 49, as well as NARAL Pro-Choice Oregon and Basic Rights Oregon. Smith came in first place in a crowded field, but lost narrowly to local schools foundation CEO Dan Ryan in the August runoff.

Business 
In 2019, Smith started her own small business, a communications consultancy called Dream Big Communications specializing in building coalitions, bringing people together, and improving communities. Through this work, Smith represents clients on social justice and education initiatives. Smith is active in the Greater Portland region, serving as a volunteer board member for Black Women for Peace, Promise Neighborhood Coalition, Travel Portland, Airway Science for Kids, and Start Making A Reader Today (SMART).

2022 congressional campaign 
On June 22, 2021, Smith announced her candidacy for Oregon's 6th congressional district, when the district's boundaries had yet to be drawn.

Personal life
Smith has one son, Jordan, born in 1990, whom she raised as a single mother. Smith is a grandmother of two and resides in Northeast Portland.

Electoral history

References

External links
 Campaign website

Living people
1966 births
21st-century American politicians
21st-century American women politicians
African-American people in Oregon politics
African-American women in politics
Candidates in the 2018 United States elections
Candidates in the 2020 United States  elections
Multnomah County Commissioners
Oregon Democrats
Oregon State University alumni
Politicians from Grand Rapids, Michigan
Women in Oregon politics
21st-century African-American women
21st-century African-American politicians
20th-century African-American people
20th-century African-American women
Candidates in the 2022 United States House of Representatives elections